The following is List of Universities and Colleges in Shanxi.

Notation

Provincial
Business College of Shanxi University (山西大學商務學院)
Shanxi University (Taiyuan) (山西大学)
Changzhi College(长治学院)
Changzhi Medical College (长治医学院)
Taiyuan University (太原大学)
Lvliang Higher College(吕梁高等专科学校)
North University of China (Taiyuan) (中北大学)
Shanxi Datong University (山西大同大学)
Shanxi Medical University (Taiyuan) (山西医科大学)
Shanxi Traditional Chinese Medicine University (Taiyuan) (山西中医学院)
Shanxi Normal University (Linfen) (山西师范大学)
Shanxi Normal University Linfen College (山西师范大学临汾学院)
Shanxi Agricultural University (Jinzhong) (山西农业大学)
Shanxi University of Finance & Economics (Taiyuan) (山西财经大学)
Taiyuan University of Science and Technology (太原科技大学)
Taiyuan Normal University (太原师范学院)
Taiyuan University of Technology (太原理工大学)
Xinzhou Teachers University (忻州师范学院)
Yuncheng University (运城学院)

References
List of Chinese Higher Education Institutions — Ministry of Education
List of Chinese universities, including official links
Shanxi Institutions Admitting International Students

 
Shanxi